Antoni Malczyk (31 March 1902 – 19 December 1972) was a Polish footballer. He played in two matches for the Poland national football team in 1925.

References

External links
 

1902 births
1972 deaths
Polish footballers
Poland international footballers
Place of birth missing
Association footballers not categorized by position